Matthew Mayer (born September 23, 1999) is an American college basketball player for the Illinois Fighting Illini of the Big Ten Conference. He previously played for the Baylor Bears.

High school career
Mayer attended Westlake High School in Austin, Texas, where he played alongside future NCAA Division I players Brock Cunningham, Keonte Kennedy and Will Baker. He committed to playing college basketball for Baylor over offers from Texas and Texas A&M, among others. Mayer was a consensus four-star recruit, according to major recruiting services.

College career
Mayer had a limited role during his first two years at Baylor. In his junior season, he improved his efficiency and was a key contributor off the bench for the national champion Bears. Mayer grew a mullet upon the advice of his teammate Jackson Moffatt, who had the same hairstyle. Mayer averaged 8.1 points and 3.7 rebounds per game. Following the season, he declared for the 2021 NBA draft, but ultimately returned for his senior season. In his senior season, Mayer started all 33 games and averaged 9.8 points and 5.0 rebounds per game. He again declared for the NBA draft after the season, but later withdrew and announced he was transferring to Illinois. In his lone season at Illinois, Mayer was named to the Third Team All-Big Ten by both coaches and media.

Career statistics

College

|-
| style="text-align:left;"| 2018–19
| style="text-align:left;"| Baylor
| 33 || 0 || 11.8 || .331 || .308 || .660 || 2.0 || .8 || .5 || .2 || 4.6
|-
| style="text-align:left;"| 2019–20
| style="text-align:left;"| Baylor
| 30 || 0 || 11.6 || .422 || .378 || .690 || 1.9 || .8 || .5 || .1 || 4.8
|-
| style="text-align:left;"| 2020–21
| style="text-align:left;"| Baylor
| 30 || 0 || 15.7 || .489 || .395 || .592 || 3.7 || 1.0 || 1.2 || .3 || 8.1
|-
| style="text-align:left;"| 2021–22
| style="text-align:left;"| Baylor
| 33 || 33 || 22.8 || .409 || .324 || .700 || 5.0 || 1.0 || 1.2 || .8 || 9.8
|- class="sortbottom"
| style="text-align:center;" colspan="2"| Career
|126 || 33 || 15.5 || .415 || .345 || .659 || 3.2 || .9 || .9 || .4 || 6.9

References

External links
Baylor Bears bio

1999 births
Living people
American men's basketball players
Basketball players from Austin, Texas
Baylor Bears men's basketball players
Illinois Fighting Illini men's basketball players
Shooting guards
Small forwards
Westlake High School (Texas) alumni